The Church of Saint Nicholas, also known as the Church of All Souls, is a Greek Catholic church in Valletta, Malta, dedicated to Saint Nicholas. Originally built as a Greek Orthodox church in 1569, it was conceded to the Confraternity of the Souls in Purgatory in 1639, who rebuilt the church in the Baroque style in 1652. The church was passed back to the Greek Catholic congregation in 2014 however the church is used from Ecumenical Patriarchate of Constantinople.

History
The Church of St. Nicholas was originally built in 1569 as a Byzantine Rite parish church for the Greek Orthodox Church. The Greek Catholic Church came into existence following the Union of Brest in 1595–96. In 1639, the parish priest Papas Giovanni Metaxi decided to separate from the Orthodox church and join the Greek Catholic Church, and he conceded the church to the Confraternity of the Souls in Purgatory.

The church building was completely reconstructed to designs of the Baroque architect Francesco Buonamici in 1652. Relations between the parish and the Confraternity are regulated by a concordat signed on 17 September 1766.

The church suffered considerable due to aerial bombardment during World War II. It was repaired by 1951, and the repair works included a complete reconstruction of the façade.

The church formally passed back into the hands of the local Greek Catholic congregation in 2014. Today, it is used by the Roman Catholic church although authority falls under Greek Catholic hierarch Archimandrite Fr. George Mifsud Montanaro. Greek Catholic (Byzantine Rite) liturgy is celebrated daily at the nearby Church of Our Lady of Damascus. The church is also used for Sunday Divine Services by the Serbian Orthodox Church.

Today, the church is a Grade 1 national monument, and it is also listed on the National Inventory of the Cultural Property of the Maltese Islands.

Architecture

The Church of St. Nicholas is built in the Baroque style. Its façade is divided into three bays at ground level, with a single central bay on the upper part. The church has a Greek cross plan, with a central dome over the crossing supported by four free-standing columns. It has a choir in the apse, which is flanked by a small sacristy. The church has a single bell tower which is located to the rear of the building.

See also

Culture of Malta
History of Malta
List of churches in Malta
Religion in Malta

References

Buildings and structures in Valletta
Baroque church buildings in Malta
Limestone churches in Malta
Greek Orthodox churches
Eastern Christianity in Malta
1569 establishments in Malta
Churches completed in 1652
Church buildings with domes
National Inventory of the Cultural Property of the Maltese Islands
Greek Catholic churches in Malta
Eastern Orthodox church buildings in Malta
Roman Catholic churches in Malta